Oocorys sulcata is a species of large sea snail, a marine gastropod mollusk in the family Cassidae, the helmet snails and bonnet snails.

Distribution
This species occurs in the Atlantic Ocean off Morocco and the Azores.

Description 
The maximum recorded shell length is 55 mm.

Habitat 
Minimum recorded depth is 161 m. Maximum recorded depth is 5073 m.

References

 Tomlin, J.R. le B. (1927). Reports on the marine Mollusca in the collections of the South African Museum. II. Families Abyssochrysidae, Oocorythidae, Haliotidae, Tonnidae. Annals of the South African Museum 25(1): 77–83.
 Sysoev A.V. (2014). Deep-sea fauna of European seas: An annotated species check-list of benthic invertebrates living deeper than 2000 m in the seas bordering Europe. Gastropoda. Invertebrate Zoology. Vol.11. No.1: 134–155 
 Beu, A. G. (2008). Recent deep-water Cassidae of the world. A revision of Galeodea, Oocorys, Sconsia, Echinophoria and related taxa, with new genera and species (Mollusca, Gastropoda). in: Héros, V. et al. (Ed.) Tropical Deep-Sea Benthos 25. Mémoires du Muséum national d'Histoire naturelle (1993). 196: 269-387
 Rosenberg, G.; Moretzsohn, F.; García, E. F. (2009). Gastropoda (Mollusca) of the Gulf of Mexico, Pp. 579–699 in: Felder, D.L. and D.K. Camp (eds.), Gulf of Mexico–Origins, Waters, and Biota. Texas A&M Press, College Station, Texas
 Verbinnen G., Segers L., Swinnen F., Kreipl K. & Monsecour D. (2016). Cassidae. An amazing family of seashells. Harxheim: ConchBooks. 251 pp
 Steyn, D.G & Lussi, M. (2005). Offshore Shells of Southern Africa: A pictorial guide to more than 750 Gastropods. Published by the authors. Pp. i–vi, 1–289 page(s): 60
 Steyn, D.G & Lussi, M. (2005). Offshore Shells of Southern Africa: A pictorial guide to more than 750 Gastropods. Published by the authors. Pp. i–vi, 1–289.
page(s): 60

External links
 Fischer, P. (1884 ("1883") ). Diagnoses d'espèces nouvelles de mollusques recueillis dans le cours de l'expédition scientifique du "Talisman. Journal de Conchyliologie. 31: 391-394
 Locard, A., 1897 Mollusques testacés. In: Expéditions scientifiques du Travailleur et du Talisman pendant les années 1880, 1881, 1882, 1883, vol. 1, p. 516 p, 22 pls
 Dall, W. H. (1908). Reports on the dredging operations off the west coast of Central America to the Galapagos, to the west coast of Mexico, and in the Gulf of California, in charge of Alexander Agassiz, carried on by the U.S. Fish Commission steamer "Albatross," during 1891, Lieut.-Commander Z.L. Tanner, U.S.N., commanding. XXXVII. Reports on the scientific results of the expedition to the eastern tropical Pacific, in charge of Alexander Agassiz, by the U.S. Fish Commission steamer "Albatross", from October, 1904 to March, 1905, Lieut.-Commander L.M. Garrett, U.S.N., commanding. XIV. The Mollusca and Brachiopoda. Bulletin of the Museum of Comparative Zoology. 43(6): 205-487, pls 1-22
 Schepman M.M. (1909) The Prosobranchia of the Siboga Expedition. Part II. Taenioglossa and Ptenoglossa. Siboga-Expeditie, 49b: 107-231, pls. 10-16. Leiden, E.J. Brill.
  Quinn J. F. (1980). A new genus, species and subspecies of Oocorythidae from the Western Atlantic. The Nautilus 94: 149-158
 Smith, E.A. (1906). Natural history notes from R. I. M. S. Investigator. Series III., no. 10. On Mollusca from the Bay of Bengal and the Arabian Sea. Annals and Magazine of Natural History. series 7, 18, 157–175, 245–264
  Serge GOFAS, Ángel A. LUQUE, Joan Daniel OLIVER,José TEMPLADO & Alberto SERRA (2021) - The Mollusca of Galicia Bank (NE Atlantic Ocean); European Journal of Taxonomy 785: 1–114

Cassidae
Gastropods described in 1883